The 6th Critics' Choice Documentary Awards were presented on November 14, 2021 at the BRIC in Brooklyn, New York, honoring the finest achievements in documentary filmmaking and non-fiction television. It was hosted by Roy Wood Jr.

Ascension and Summer of Soul (…Or, When the Revolution Could Not Be Televised) led the nominations with six each with the latter winning all of its nominations.

Winners and nominees
The nominations were announced on October 18, 2021.

Pennebaker Award
R. J. Cutler

Films with multiple nominations

See also
94th Academy Awards

References

External links
Critics' Choice Documentary Awards official website

Critics' Choice Documentary Awards
Critics' Choice Documentary Awards